{{family name hatnote|Đỗ|Mạnh (simply) or Duy Mạnh (politely)|Do|lang=Vietnamese}}

Đỗ Duy Mạnh (born 29 September 1996) is a Vietnamese professional footballer who plays as a centre-back for V.League 1 side Hà Nội and the Vietnam national team.

Duy Mạnh was promoted to Hanoi FC first team in 2015 season and instantly became an important part of the team, he won 2015 V.League 1 best young player award at the end of the season. Duy Mạnh has represented Vietnam at various youth levels and was he called up to senior team in 2015 at the age of 19. Duy Mạnh is one of the most promising young footballers in Vietnam at the moment.

Early life
Born on 29 September 1996 in Đông Anh District, Hanoi. Duy Mạnh idolised Cristiano Ronaldo since his childhood. He started play football around the age of eight. In 2006, at the age of ten, he started training at Hanoi football training center and then transferred to Hanoi T&T F.C. later on in 2013. On December of the same year, Duy Mạnh along with his club mate Phạm Đức Huy had a trial with J2 League club Consadole Sapporo.

Club career

Hà Nội F.C.

Đỗ Duy Mạnh was promoted to Hà Nội F.C. first team from 2015 season. On 4 January 2015, he made his debut for Hanoi T&T F.C. in V.League 1 at the first-round game against Đồng Tâm Long An F.C., came in as a substitute and scored the equaliser at the 71st minute. He since then became a regular for the starting eleven. On September, Duy Mạnh won the 2015 V.League 1 young player of the season award.

International career
International goals

Vietnam under-16

Vietnam under-19

Throughout 2013 to 2014, Duy Mạnh was frequently called up to U-19 team. He putted on a solid performance when replacing injured captain Lương Xuân Trường at 2014 AFC U-19 Championship qualification, but he was dropped from the squad later on in the final tournament.

Vietnam under-23 and Olympic

Đỗ Duy Mạnh was called up to U-23 team in March 2015 for 2016 AFC U-23 Championship qualification but his injury kept him out until the last group game against Macau.

He was a regular for Vietnam at SEA Games 2015 that won the bronze medal.Scores and results list Vietnam's goal tally first.Vietnam national team 

Đỗ Duy Mạnh debuted for the senior national team at 2018 FIFA World Cup qualification (AFC) game against Iraq on 8 March 2015. He played the whole game and his performance was praised by the media.

InternationalScores and results list Vietnam's goal tally first.''

Honours
Hà Nội
V.League 1: 2016, 2018, 2019, 2022; Runner-up: 2015, 2020  
Vietnamese National Cup: 2019, 2020, 2022; Runner-up: 2015, 2016
Vietnamese Super Cup: 2019, 2020, 2021; Runner-up: 2016, 2017 
Vietnam U23/Olympic
Southeast Asian Games Bronze medal: 2015
AFC U-23 Championship Runner-up: 2018
Asian Games Fourth place: 2018
VFF Cup: 2018
Vietnam 
AFF Championship: 2018; runner-up: 2022
VFF Cup: 2022
King's Cup runner-up: 2019

Individuals
 Best Young Player of V.League 1: 2015

References

External links
 
 youtube.com

1996 births
Living people
Vietnamese footballers
Association football midfielders
Hanoi FC players
V.League 1 players
Sportspeople from Hanoi
Vietnam international footballers
Southeast Asian Games bronze medalists for Vietnam
Southeast Asian Games medalists in football
Footballers at the 2018 Asian Games
2019 AFC Asian Cup players
Competitors at the 2015 Southeast Asian Games
Competitors at the 2017 Southeast Asian Games
Asian Games competitors for Vietnam